Entelopes longzhouensis is a species of beetle in the family Cerambycidae. It was described by Hua in 1990.

References

Saperdini
Beetles described in 1990